Hussey Burgh Macartney (10 April 1799 – 8 October 1894) was the Dean of Melbourne from 1852 until his death.

The son of Sir John Macartney, 1st Baronet and his second wife Catherine Burgh (daughter of the eminent but short-lived judge Walter Hussey Burgh), he was born in Dublin, Ireland, and educated at Trinity College, Dublin. He was ordained in 1823 and was a curate in Banagher, Killoe and Killashee. After this he held incumbencies at Creagh and Kilcock. In 1847 he sailed to Australia with Charles Perry, the first Bishop of Melbourne. Perry made him Archdeacon of Geelong in 1848 and Dean of Melbourne’s new cathedral, St James, four years later. St James was the Anglican cathedral church until St Paul's Cathedral was consecrated in 1891.

In regard to the colonisation of Australia, Macartney was quoted as saying that Aboriginal people "were not the rightful owners of the soil" and had "not been unjustly dispossessed by the white man".

Macartney was married to Jane Macartney, who helped establish and manage various charitable institutions in Melbourne, often with Bishop Charles Perry's wife, Frances Perry.

One son, Hussey Burgh Macartney, junior, was vicar of St. Mary's Anglican Church Caulfield, Victoria, for 30 years. Another was John Arthur Macartney, a Queensland pastoralist.

A grandson, Hussey Burgh George Macartney, was a captain in the Royal Fusiliers who was injured in the Boer War and died in the Great War.

A great-grandson, Jim Macartney, was a noted newspaper editor and media figure in Western Australia.

Macartney died in East Melbourne, Victoria, Australia on 9 October 1894.

References

1799 births
Christian clergy from Dublin (city)
Alumni of Trinity College Dublin
Archdeacons of Melbourne
Deans of Melbourne
Younger sons of baronets
1894 deaths